Mi Vida is a 2019 Dutch film directed by Norbert ter Hall. The film won the Golden Film award after having sold 100,000 tickets.

Alette Kraan won the Golden Calf award for Best Costume Design. The film also won the Gold Remi award at the WorldFest-Houston International Film Festival.

References

External links 
 

2019 films
Dutch comedy-drama films
Films directed by Norbert ter Hall
2010s Dutch-language films